KTMM (1340 AM) is a radio station broadcasting an All Sports format. Licensed to serve Grand Junction, Colorado, United States, it serves the Grand Junction area. The station is currently owned by MBC Grand Broadcasting.

References

External links

TMM
CBS Sports Radio stations